= American Health Connection =

American patient appointments company

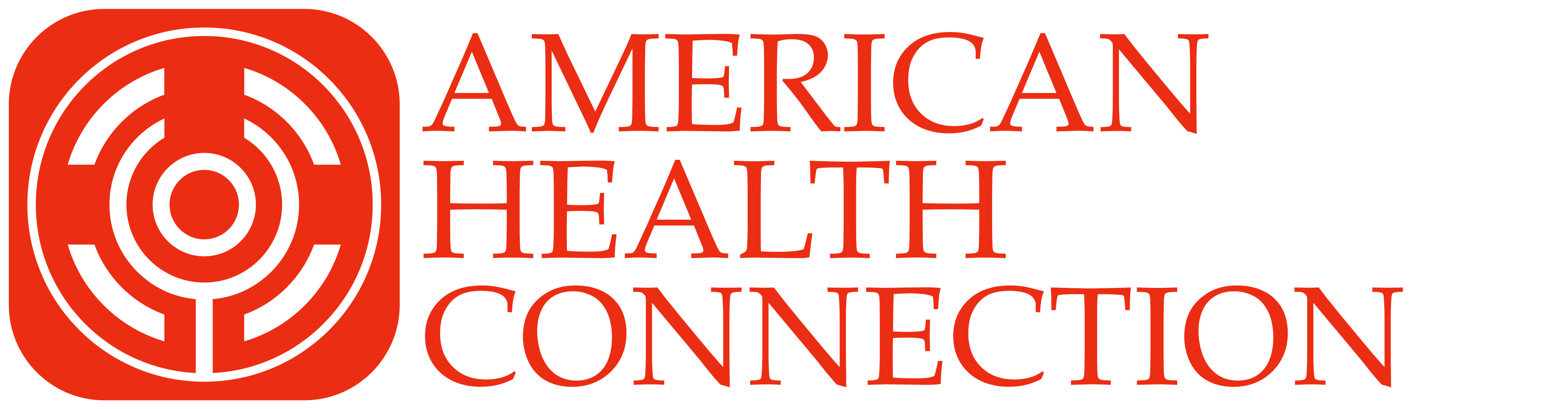
- Company type: Private
- Industry: Healthcare
- Founded: Beverly Hills, California, United States (2011)
- Founders: Yuriy Kotlyar and Azadeh Williamson
- Headquarters: Beverly Hills, California, California, United States
- Key people: Yuriy Kotlyar, Founder & CEO; Azadeh Williamson, Founder & President
- Products: Patient Communication Management
- Revenue: $30 million (2014)
- Number of employees: 450 (2014)
- Website: americanhealthconnection.com

American Health Connection is an American healthcare call center corporation, headquartered in Beverly Hills, California. Current business products focus on centralizing appointment scheduling departments, automated reminder calls, patient access consulting, and discharge follow-up calls. The company is most known by its patient communication management process, primarily for large hospitals. The company also maintains a small division that focuses on software and system development for both internal and client use.

== History ==
The company originated in 2009 by Yuriy Kotlyar and Azadeh Williamson. After two years of research and development, American Health Connection was incorporated by early 2011. An unconfirmed research report suggested the company was the first to implement a work-at-home model for its patient communication specialists in healthcare industry. The same research reports that as of 2014, the American Health Connection workforce exceeded 450 agents,. As of September 2014, American Health Connection has been approved for Military Spouse Employment Partnership.
